Workin' Moms is a Canadian television sitcom that premiered on CBC Television on January 10, 2017. The show stars Catherine Reitman, Jessalyn Wanlim, Dani Kind, Enuka Okuma, and Juno Rinaldi as a group of friends dealing with the challenges of being working mothers. The series is produced by Wolf + Rabbit Entertainment, the production company of Reitman and her husband, Philip Sternberg.

In February 2019, in the middle of season 3, the series premiered globally on Netflix. On May 29, 2019, Workin' Moms was renewed for a fourth season, which premiered on February 18, 2020. In April 2020, the series was renewed for a fifth season, which premiered on February 16, 2021. In June 2021, the series was renewed for a sixth season., which premiered on January 4, 2022. On June 20, 2022, creator Catherine Reitman announced that pre-production had begun on a seventh and final season, which premiered on January 3, 2023.

Episodes

Season 1 (2017)

Season 2 (2017–18)

Season 3 (2019)

Season 4 (2020)

Season 5 (2021)

Season 6 (2022)

Season 7 (2023)

References 

2017 Canadian television series debuts
Canadian television sitcoms
Lists of Canadian sitcom episodes
Lists of Canadian comedy television series episodes
Lists of sitcom episodes
Workin' Moms